Copernican system may refer to:
 Copernican heliocentrism
 Rocks on the Earth's moon deposited during the Copernican period